Luciano Lollo (born March 29, 1987 in Alejo Ledesma, Argentina) is an Argentine footballer who plays for Estudiantes in the Argentine Primera División as a centre-back.

References

External links
 Luciano Lollo at BDFA.com.ar 
 
 

1987 births
Living people
Argentine footballers
Argentine Primera División players
Primera Nacional players
Club Atlético Belgrano footballers
Racing Club de Avellaneda footballers
Club Atlético River Plate footballers
Club Atlético Banfield footballers
Estudiantes de La Plata footballers
Association football defenders
Sportspeople from Córdoba Province, Argentina